Old Trap (also, Oldtrap and The Trap) is a rural community in Camden County, North Carolina, United States.

Old Trap was once called "The Trap" for the saloons the community contained which locals perceived as immoral.

References

Populated places in North Carolina
Geography of Camden County, North Carolina